Pierce A. Morrissey (April 15, 1870 – 1956) was a member of the Wisconsin State Senate.

Biography
Born in Nepeuskun, Wisconsin, Morrissey attended school in Waukau, Wisconsin.

Career
Morrissey represented the 19th district in the Senate. Previously, he was Assessor of Nepeuskun from 1912 to 1917 and Chairman and a member of the Board of Supervisors in 1922. He was a Democrat.

Morrisey died in 1956, an application for probate of his will being filed in November of that year.

References

People from Winnebago County, Wisconsin
Democratic Party Wisconsin state senators
1870 births
1956 deaths